is a J-pop singer famous in Japan for her unconventional light singing style and ukulele music. She rose to fame after performing the end-title track for the Studio Ghibli film The Cat Returns in 2002. Her other music for TV and anime includes "Tanpopo" for Tensai Terebi Kun.

Biography
In 1993, Tsuji attended Kyoto City Dohda Senior High School of Arts where, during an activities class, she started to learn the ukulele after finding her hands were too small to correctly hold and play the guitar.

In 1996, Tsuji attended Ryukoku University as a student under the literature department.

She released a mini-album entitled Urara from LD & K Records, making this her independent debut as a musician.

She graduated as a historian from Ryukoku University's Department of Oriental History.

Discography

Albums

Singles

DVDs

References

External links
  
 Ayano Tsuji's personal blog (May 1, 2005, to August 24, 2010) 
 Ayano Tsuji's personal blog (from August 24, 2010) 
 NPR music profile of Ayano Tsuji by producer Robert Rand

Japanese women singer-songwriters
Japanese women pop singers
Ukulele players
1978 births
Living people
Musicians from Kyoto Prefecture
20th-century Japanese women singers
20th-century Japanese singers
21st-century Japanese women singers
21st-century Japanese singers